The Ford Puma Rally1 is a Rally1 car built by the M-Sport Ford World Rally Team that is set to use in the World Rally Championship starting in . The car was revealed at the 2021 Goodwood Festival of Speed.

World Rally Championship results

WRC victories

Rally results

Complete World Rally Championship results

* Season still in progress.

References

External links

Ford Puma Rally1 at eWRC-results.com

Rally1 cars
All-wheel-drive vehicles
Ford Rally Sport vehicles